was a town located in Maniwa District, Okayama Prefecture, Japan.

As of 2003, the town had an estimated population of 9,027 and a density of 65.04 persons per km2. The total area was 138.79 km2.

On March 31, 2005, Katsuyama, along with the town of Hokubō (from Jōbō District), and towns of Kuse, Ochiai and Yubara, and the villages of Chūka, Kawakami, Mikamo and Yatsuka (all from Maniwa District) were merged to create the city of Maniwa.

To coincide with the 2005 merger, Katsuyama residents were given a book commemorating the last 50 years of Katsuyama's existence as a town and a special purple cloth with the town logo imprinted on it.

Recently, Katsuyama has also become known for its noren adorning the shops and houses along a 1 km stretch of the Katsuyama Historical Preservation District, wherein the Edo Period landscape of the town remains. The noren are all made by one craftswoman, Yoko Kano, who has her own workshop along the street.

Traditional Products
Katsuyama is famous for its bamboo basketry, originating from the town's Tsukida district, and four types of baskets produced there are designated as "Traditional Japanese Crafts".

Also famous is Gozenshu sake made by Katsuyama's Tsuji Honten brewery which has been in the town since the early 1800s, having relocated from nearby Ochiai.

Geography
Rivers: Asahi River (The big-3 river through Okayama Prefecture).

Adjoining municipalities in Okayama Prefecture: 
Kuse,
Ochiai,
Yubara,
Mikamo,
Hokubō, and
Ōsa.

Education
Katsuyama Elementary School
Tsukida Elementary School
Tomihara Elementary School
Katsuyama Junior High School
Okayama Prefectural Katsuyama High School

Transportation

Railways
West Japan Railway Company
Kishin Line
Chūgoku-Katsuyama Station – Tsukida Station – Tomihara Station

Road
National highways:
Route 181
Route 313
Prefectural roads:
Okayama Prefectural Route 32 (Niimi-Katsuyama)
Okayama Prefectural Route 84 (Katsuyama-Kurihara)
Okayama Prefectural Route 201 (Kanba waterfall)
Okayama Prefectural Route 311 (Akuchi-Kami)
Okayama Prefectural Route 320 (Wakashiro-Hōkoku Station)
Okayama Prefectural Route 321 (Kōjiro-Katsuyama)
Okayama Prefectural Route 390 (Komi-Tsukida Station)
Okayama Prefectural Route 459 (Wakashiro-Kōjiro)

Notable places and events
Katsuyama castle town
Katsuyama Historical Preservation District
Kanba waterfall
Katsuyama Festival (October 19–20)

References

External links
Official website of Maniwa in Japanese
http://darumapilgrim.blogspot.com/2006/12/izumo-kaido-katsuyama.html
Tsuji brewery webpages (in Japanese)
https://www.flickr.com/groups/1133664@N25/pool/with/4298539887/ Katsuyama photo group on Flickr

Dissolved municipalities of Okayama Prefecture
Maniwa